The Hand That Bears the Sword is the second book of the Trophy Chase Trilogy, written by American author George Bryan Polivka, and published by Harvest House Publishers.

Setting 
The Hand That Bears the Sword takes place in the fictional country of Nearing Vast, in a time of sailing ships, pirates, sea monsters, and swordsmen. The key characters are a young swordsman, Packer Throme, and his love, Panna Throme, whose story is told throughout the Trophy Case trilogy.

Plot summary 
Newlyweds Packer and Panna Throme are called upon by their government to undertake a new adventure. Packer, having proven himself a hero in the events of the previous book, is asked to lend his name and credibility to the coming war with the rivals across the sea, The Kingdom of Drammun. As Packer leads the fight aboard the Trophy Chase, he faces both the Drammune and the revenge of Scat Wilkins. Meanwhile, Panna faces her own troubles, held against her will by a lecherous prince.

Spiritual components 
Packer was originally called to the priesthood, but failed in seminary. Panna is the daughter of the local priest, who is bitterly disappointed in Packer. Packer’s conscience is tried as he attempts to reconcile his original calling, and the teachings of Jesus to “turn the other cheek,” with his swordsmanship. He wants to bring prosperity to Nearing Vast, but do the means justify the end? The storylines also feature the power of prayer, and the motivations of faith.

References 

2007 books